Michaela Schuster is a German operatic mezzo-soprano. She debuted at The Royal Opera as Herodias in Salome in 2008, and has since sung Princesse de Bouillon in Adriana Lecouvreur, and Venus in Tannhäuser. In the 2013/14 season, she sang Klytämnestra in Elektra and the Nurse in Die Frau ohne Schatten. In Gran Teatre del Liceu, 2016, she performed the role of Waltraute in Götterdämmerung.

References

Living people
German opera singers
Operatic mezzo-sopranos
Year of birth missing (living people)